The 4th Infantry Brigade (Lebanon) was a Lebanese Army unit that fought in the Lebanese Civil War, being active from its creation in January 1983 until its destruction in September that year, in the wake of the Mountain War.

Origins
In the aftermath of the June–September 1982 Israeli invasion of Lebanon, President Amin Gemayel, convinced that a strong and unified national defense force was a prerequisite to rebuilding the nation, announced plans to raise a 60,000-man army organized into twelve brigades (created from existing infantry regiments), trained and equipped by France and the United States. In late 1982, the 4th Infantry Regiment was therefore re-organized and expanded to a brigade group numbering 2,000 men, most of whom were Maronite Christians from the Mount Lebanon region and Druzes from the Chouf District, which became in January 1983 the 4th Infantry Brigade.

Emblem

Structure and organization
The new unit grew from an understrength battalion comprising three rifle companies to a fully equipped mechanized infantry brigade, capable of aligning a Headquarters' (HQ) battalion, an armoured battalion equipped with Staghound armoured cars, (soon replaced by Panhard AML-90 armoured cars), AMX-13 light tanks and thirty M48A5 main battle tanks (MBTs), three mechanized infantry battalions (41st, 42nd and 43rd) issued with fifty M113 and AMX-VCI armored personnel carriers (APC), plus an artillery battalion (45th) fielding US M101A1 105mm towed field howitzers and FH-70 155mm Howitzers. The Brigade also fielded a logistics battalion, equipped with 250 soft-skin vehicles of various types, which consisted of US M151A1 jeeps, Land-Rover long wheelbase series III, Jeep Gladiator J20, M880/M890 Series CUCV, Chevrolet C20 and Dodge Ram (1st generation) pickups, plus US M35A2 2½-ton (6x6) military trucks. Headquartered in the Mount Lebanon region, the Brigade was initially commanded by Colonel Jurj Haruq, later replaced by Col. Nayef Kallas.

Combat history

The Lebanese Civil War

In early September 1983, under the command of Colonel Nayef Kallas, Fourth Brigade's units were deployed at the towns of Khalde, Aramoun, Kabr Chmoun and Shahhar – where they relieved the Christian Lebanese Forces (LF) militia garrisons that had repulsed the first wave of ground assaults by the Druze People's Liberation Army (PLA) militia led by Walid Jumblatt and were running out of supplies – in the Chouf District, being entrusted with the mission of defending the southern approaches of Beirut. Like their colleagues of the Eighth Brigade led by Colonel Michel Aoun at Souk El Gharb, the Fourth Brigade bore the brunt of the Druze PLA attacks for three days, until it began to show signs of a confessional split in the ranks, since its Druze soldiers were reluctant to fight their coreligionists.

On February 13, 1984, a Shi'ite Amal Movement force succeeded in driving out other Lebanese Army units from their positions in the southern approaches to west Beirut, seizing Khalde (with the exception of the adjoining International Airport, still being held by the U.S. Marines' contingent of the Multinational Force in Lebanon), tightening the noose around the beleaguered Fourth Brigade. Lebanese Air Force Hawker Hunter jets flew their last combat sortie over the Chouf, carrying out air strikes against advancing Druze PLA forces on the western portion of the Shahhar region in support of the Fourth Brigade's units reinforced by the 101st Ranger Battalion from the 10th Airmobile Brigade fighting desperately to retain their positions at Aabey, Kfar Matta, Ain Ksour, and Al-Beniyeh, which achieved little success due to poor planning and lack of coordination with Lebanese Army units fighting on the ground. This situation was exacerbated by the fact that Lebanese National Salvation Front (LNSF) militias managed to intercept, alter, and retransmit Lebanese Army radio communications, which allowed them to impersonate the LAF command in east Beirut by ordering Fourth Brigade units to retreat to safer positions. Simultaneously, they ordered Lebanese Army's artillery units positioned at east Beirut to shell their own troops' positions in the western Chouf, which wreaked havoc among Fourth Brigade units and forced them to fall back in disorder towards the coast while being subjected to friendly fire.

On February 14, after linking up at Khalde with their Shi'ite Amal Movement allies, the Druze PLA militia forces drove the Fourth Brigade from their remaining positions in the western Shahhar region 3½ miles (about 4 km) south to the vicinity of Damour and Es-Saadiyat, in the Iqlim al-Kharrub coastal enclave, as they attempted to create a salient from Aley to the coast at Khalde, south of Beirut.  Surrounded and badly mauled, the Brigade disintegrated when approximately 900 Druze enlisted men, plus 60 Officers and NCOs, deserted to join their coreligionists of Jumblatt's PLA or Syrian Social Nationalist Party (SSNP) militias. The remainder 1,000 or so Maronite Christian Officers' and men either withdrew to the coast, regrouping at the Damour – Es-Saadiyat area or fled south across the Awali River, seeking protection behind Israeli lines while leaving behind some US-made Tanks and APCs, Jeeps, trucks, Howitzers, and ammunition. After reaching Damour and Sidon, the soldiers were evacuated by sea under the auspices of the Lebanese Navy to east Beirut, where they enrolled in the 10th Airmobile Brigade and other Christian-dominated army units.

Most of the Fourth Brigade's abandoned equipment was shared by several Lebanese militias, namely the Lebanese Forces (LF), the Druze PSP/PLA, the Shia Amal Movement and the South Lebanon Army (SLA). According to a CIA report, at least a total of twenty-seven M48A5 MBTs, fourteen M113 APCs and thirty-four trucks were reportedly sighted stored at several locations north of the Awali River, including a quarry east of Al-Harah and other places along the coastal road between that river and Damour. The LF salvaged seven M48A5 MBTs, five AMX-13 light tanks, twelve Panhard AML-90 armoured cars, some M113 APCs, and a number of FH-70 155mm Howitzers, while the Druze militias seized forty-three M113 APCs and AMX-13 light tanks and seven M48A5 MBTs, as well as some M101A1 105mm towed field howitzers. Amal seized a number of Panhard AML-90 armoured cars, AMX-13 light tanks,  and AMX-VCI and M113 APCs, whilst the SLA also captured eight M113 APCs and a few AMX-VCI APCs and seven M48A5 tanks. The SLA, LF, Amal and the PSP/PLA also seized all the defunct Brigade's liaison and transport vehicles, which the latter three militias turned into technicals by re-arming them with heavy machine guns, recoilless rifles and anti-aircraft autocannons.

Disbandment
Despite having been destroyed in September 1983, the Fourth Brigade remained listed in the Lebanese Armed Forces (LAF) order-of-battle until its official disbandment in March 1984. Nevertheless, on a meeting held on 28 June that same year, the LAF Military Council decided to reform the Fourth Brigade but, due to political constraints, such plans were put on hold for the duration of the War. When the Lebanese Army Brigades were reorganized during the post-civil war period in the 1990s, the Army Command in the end opted for not reforming the Fourth Brigade (unlike the Second and Third Brigades, both disbanded in 1984-87 and re-activated in June 1991), and is not presently part of the LAF structure.

See also
 Amal Movement
 Lebanese Armed Forces
 Lebanese Civil War
 Lebanese Forces
 List of weapons of the Lebanese Civil War
 Syrian Social Nationalist Party in Lebanon
 Mountain War (Lebanon)
 Progressive Socialist Party
 People's Liberation Army (Lebanon)
 1st Infantry Brigade (Lebanon)
 2nd Infantry Brigade (Lebanon)
 3rd Infantry Brigade (Lebanon)
 5th Infantry Brigade (Lebanon)
 6th Infantry Brigade (Lebanon)
 7th Infantry Brigade (Lebanon)
 8th Infantry Brigade (Lebanon)
 9th Infantry Brigade (Lebanon)
 10th Infantry Brigade (Lebanon)
 11th Infantry Brigade (Lebanon)
 12th Infantry Brigade (Lebanon)

Notes

References

 Aram Nerguizian, Anthony H. Cordesman & Arleigh A. Burke, The Lebanese Armed Forces: Challenges and Opportunities in Post-Syria Lebanon, Burke Chair in Strategy, Center for Strategic & International Studies (CSIS), First Working Draft: February 10, 2009. – 
 Are J. Knudsen, Lebanese Armed Forces: A United Army for a Divided Country?, CMI INSIGHT, November 2014 No 9, Chr. Michelsen Institute (CMI), Bergen – Norway. – 
 Bassel Abi-Chahine, The People's Liberation Army through the eyes of a lens, 1975–1991, Éditions Dergham, Jdeideh (Beirut) 2019. 
 CIA report on the whereabouts of the equipment left by the destroyed Lebanese Army's 4th Infantry Brigade, Attachment to Z-17342/84, NPIC/IEG (2/84), 24 February 1984, pp. 1–4. Declassified in Part – Sanitized Copy Approved for Release 2012/03/06: CIA-RDP84T00010001-2. – 
 Denise Ammoun, Histoire du Liban contemporain: Tome 2 1943–1990, Éditions Fayard, Paris 2005.  (in French) – Histoire du Liban contemporain, tome 2: 1943–1990
 Edgar O'Ballance, Civil War in Lebanon 1975-92, Palgrave Macmillan, London 1998. 
 Éric Micheletti and Yves Debay, Liban – dix jours aux cœur des combats, RAIDS magazine n.º41, October 1989 issue.  (in French)
 Joseph Hokayem, L'armée libanaise pendant la guerre: un instrument du pouvoir du président de la République (1975–1985), Lulu.com, Beyrouth 2012. , (in French) – L'armée libanaise pendant la guerre: un instrument du pouvoir du président de la République (1975–1985)
 Ken Guest, Lebanon, in Flashpoint! At the Front Line of Today's Wars, Arms and Armour Press, London 1994, pp. 97–111.  
 Leigh Neville, Technicals: Non-Standard Tactical Vehicles from the Great Toyota War to modern Special Forces, New Vanguard series 257, Osprey Publishing Ltd, Oxford 2018. 
 Matthew S. Gordon, The Gemayels (World Leaders Past & Present), Chelsea House Publishers, 1988. 
 Moustafa El-Assad, Civil Wars Volume 1: The Gun Trucks, Blue Steel books, Sidon 2008. 
 Oren Barak, The Lebanese Army – A National institution in a divided society, State University of New York Press, Albany 2009.  – The Lebanese Army: A National Institution in a Divided Society
 Rex Brynen, Sanctuary and Survival: the PLO in Lebanon, Boulder: Westview Press, Oxford 1990.  – Sanctuary and Survival: The PLO in Lebanon
 Robert Fisk, Pity the Nation: Lebanon at War, London: Oxford University Press, (3rd ed. 2001).  – Pity the Nation: Lebanon at War
 Samer Kassis, 30 Years of Military Vehicles in Lebanon, Beirut: Elite Group, 2003. 
 Samer Kassis, Véhicules Militaires au Liban/Military Vehicles in Lebanon 1975–1981, Trebia Publishing, Chyah 2012. 
 Samuel M. Katz, Lee E. Russel, and Ron Volstad, Armies in Lebanon 1982-84, Men-at-Arms series 165, Osprey Publishing Ltd, London 1985. 
 Samuel M. Katz and Ron Volstad, Arab Armies of the Middle East wars 2, Men-at-Arms series 194, Osprey Publishing Ltd, London 1988. 
 Steven J. Zaloga, Tank battles of the Mid-East Wars (2): The wars of 1973 to the present, Concord Publications, Hong Kong 2003.  – Tank Battles of the Mid-East Wars : (2) The Wars of 1973 to the present
 Thomas Collelo (ed.), Lebanon: a country study, Library of Congress, Federal Research Division, Headquarters, Department of the Army (DA Pam 550–24), Washington D.C., December 1987 (Third edition 1989). – 
 Zachary Sex & Bassel Abi-Chahine, Modern Conflicts 2 – The Lebanese Civil War, From 1975 to 1991 and Beyond, Modern Conflicts Profile Guide Volume II, AK-interactive, 2021. ISBN 8435568306073

External links
 Histoire militaire de l'armée libanaise de 1975 à 1990 (in French)
 Lebanese Armed Forces (LAF) Official Website
 Lebanon Military Guide from GlobalSecurity.org
 CIA – The World Factbook – Lebanon
 Global Fire Power – Lebanon Military Strength
 Lebanon army trying to rearm and modernize itself
 Lebanese Military Wish List 2008/2009 – New York Times

Military units and formations of Lebanon
Military units and formations established in 1983
Military units and formations disestablished in 1984
1983 establishments in Lebanon